Ars Aevi is a museum of contemporary art in Sarajevo, Bosnia and Herzegovina.  It was established during the siege of Sarajevo as a cultural resistance movement to the Bosnian war. It holds a collection of 1,600 pieces, including approximately 130 works by renowned world artists such as Pablo Picasso, Michelangelo Pistoletto, Jannis Kounellis, Joseph Beuys, Marina Abramović and Joseph Kosuth.  A new museum building, designed by Renzo Piano, is planned to be built in the upcoming years.

References

External links
Ars Aevi official website 

Art museums and galleries in Bosnia and Herzegovina
Modern art museums
Museums in Sarajevo
Culture in Sarajevo